Find Yourself is a 2020 Chinese television series starring Victoria Song, Song Weilong and Wang Yaoqing. The series airs on Hunan TV and Netflix starting January 26, 2020.

Synopsis 
He Fanxing (Victoria Song) - a director of administration at a design company - is relentlessly pursued by the company intern Yuan Song (Song Weilong). Despite him being much younger, she eventually agrees to enter into a relationship on the condition of a three-month secrecy because she is highly concerned about how her parents and others may view their large age gap. Facing problems in their relationship, mature and dependable Ye Luming (Wang Yaoqing) - CEO of an advertising agency - appears in her life under the guise of a relationship mentor. Yet, Ye Luming has a secret agenda - to win He Fanxing over from Yuan Song.

The appearance of Ye Luming causes Yuan Song to feel insecure about his relationship with He Fanxing, which spurs the creation of misunderstandings between them. For He Fanxing, the choice between Yuan Song and Ye Luming is not merely about love, but also the expectation that she should uphold traditional relationship and marriage rules. As the misunderstanding between He Fanxing and Yuan Song worsens, Yuan Song attempts to reveal their relationship to the public at a masquerade ball, yet He Fanxing finds herself unable to accept this, and decides to break up with Yuan Song. To worsen her situation, her company faces the threat of acquisition by a rival design company Aijia, plunging her into a "mid-life" crisis.

Unbeknownst to all, He Canyang (Zhang Yujian) - He Fanxing's brother - enters into a relationship with Cai Minmin (Yu Shuxin) - Ye Luming's niece and Yuan Song's schoolmate - which dramatically complicates the already complex situation between the characters. He Fanxing tries to start a relationship with Ye Luming, which becomes immediately viewed by others as a highly compatible couple. He Fanxing's father is diagnosed with early-stage dementia, which makes her increasingly impatient to get married and have children for the sake of her parents. She decides to make a more conscious attempt to fall in love with Ye Luming. He Fanxing and Ye Luming attends the birthday party of Steven's - chairman of Aijia - daughter. Yet, they unexpectedly run into Yuan Song, who is revealed as Steven's son.

Eventually, He Fanxing finds that no matter how hard she tries to fall in love with Ye Luming, she is just unable to do so. Realising that his pursuit has become a lost cause, Ye Luming decides to end their relationship, and return to being friends. After breaking up, He Fanxing has become much clearer of what she wants in a relationship. Finding out that Yuan Song has gone to Suzhou with another girl to attend an architectural conference, He Fanxing abruptly rushes to follow him there, eventually reconciling and making their relationship public straight away. Yuan Song decides to study overseas, yet their relationship is not affected in any way because of the long distance. He Fanxing has also resigned from her job, instead opening a store and becoming a florist, finally achieving a sense of fulfilment in both her career and relationship.

Cast

Main

Supporting

Production
Filming took place in Shanghai and Suzhou. The series began filming in September 2018, and wrapped up in November 2018.

Ratings 

 Highest ratings are marked in red, lowest ratings are marked in blue

Award and nominations

References

External links 

 

Chinese romantic comedy television series
Television series by Huace Media
2020 Chinese television series debuts
2020 Chinese television series endings
Hunan Television dramas